Multidentula ovularis is a species of minute air-breathing land snail, a terrestrial pulmonate gastropod mollusk in the family Enidae.

Distribution 
This species occurs in Turkey.

References

Enidae
Gastropods described in 1801
Endemic fauna of Turkey